Jorma Johan Sigurd Vaihela (30 September 1925 – 9 February 2006) was a Finnish international footballer who played as an inside forward.

Club career
Born in Raahe, Vaihela played club football in Finland for TuTo, PoPa and RU-38, and in Sweden for IK Oddevold. He started his career playing for Turun Toverit in TUL league for 2 seasons where he scored 6 goals. In Mestaruussarja he played 31 games and scored 7 goals. Between 1949 and 1953 he also played in second tier Suomensarja where he scored 30 goals in 5 seasons.

International career
Vaihela earned 34 caps at international level between 1947 and 1954, scoring 13 goals. Vaihela also participated in the 1952 Summer Olympics.

Personal life
Vaihela's son Seppo played international bandy for Sweden, and worked as the chairman of IFK Göteborg from 2007 to 2012, and before that as president for the Swedish Bandy Association.

References

1925 births
2006 deaths
Finnish footballers
Finland international footballers
Olympic footballers of Finland
Footballers at the 1952 Summer Olympics
IK Oddevold players
Finnish expatriate sportspeople in Sweden
Turun Toverit players
RU-38 (sports club) players
Porin Palloilijat players
Association football inside forwards
Finnish expatriate footballers
Expatriate footballers in Sweden
People from Raahe
Sportspeople from North Ostrobothnia